Events in the year 1838 in Peru.

Incumbents
Supreme Protector of the Peru-Bolivian Confederation: Andres de Santa Cruz
President of the Republic of North Peru: Luis Orbegoso until July 30, José de la Riva Agüero
President of the Republic of South Peru: Ramón Herrera Rodado until October 12, Juan Pío de Tristán y Moscoso

Events
January 12 - War of the Confederation: Battle of Islay
July 30 - North Peru President Obregoso declares secession of his republic from the Peru-Bolivian Confederation.
August 21 - Battle of Portada de Guías on the outskirts of Lima
October - Chilean Army occupies Lima
November 3 - Chileans abandon Lima

Births

Deaths